The Karate competition at the 2006 Central American and Caribbean Games was held in Cartagena, Colombia. The tournament was scheduled to be held from 21–25 July.

Medal summary

Men's events

Women's events

References

Central American and Caribbean Games
2006 Central American and Caribbean Games
2006